False chamomile is a common name for several plants and may refer to:

Boltonia asteroides
Tripleurospermum inodorum
Tripluerospermum maritimum